Belinda Bauer may refer to:
Belinda Bauer (actress) (born 1950), Australian actress
Belinda Bauer (author) (born 1962), British writer